Calyptrotheca is a genus of flowering plants belonging to the family Didiereaceae.

Its native range is Northeastern and Eastern Tropical Africa.

Species:

Calyptrotheca somalensis 
Calyptrotheca taitensis

References

Didiereaceae
Caryophyllales genera